On 28 June 2013, Bradley Walsh stated on This Morning that Law & Order: UK would return with a fifth series, commissioned to start filming in October 2013. In September 2013, broadcaster ITV confirmed that Law & Order: UK would return in 2014 with an eight episode series, and that Ben Bailey Smith had been cast as DS Joe Hawkins, replacing Paul Nicholls as DS Sam Casey.

This was the last series of Law & Order: UK to air, with broadcaster ITV and producer Kudos issuing a joint press release, on 3 June 2014, announcing that it would be "the last to be transmitted for the foreseeable future".

Cast

Main

Law
 Bradley Walsh as Senior Detective Sergeant Ronnie Brooks
 Ben Bailey Smith as Junior Detective Sergeant Joe Hawkins
 Paterson Joseph as Detective Inspector Wes Leyton (Episodes 1–7)
 Sharon Small as Detective Inspector Elisabeth Flynn (Episode 8)

Order
 Dominic Rowan as Senior Crown Prosecutor Jacob Thorne
 Georgia Taylor as Junior Crown Prosecutor Kate Barker
 Peter Davison as Henry Sharpe, Director of London Crown Prosecution Service

Episodes
Note: Temporary episode guide taken from ITV press release.

References

Law & Order: UK
2014 British television seasons